The chestnut-naped spurfowl (Pternistis castaneicollis) is a species of bird in the pheasant family Phasianidae. At  in length and weighing , it is a large species of spurfowl.
It is found in Ethiopia and  Somaliland. The population is believed to be stable but according to the International Union for Conservation of Nature (IUCN) there is insufficient data to make an estimate of the population.

Taxonomy
The chestnut-naped spurfowl was described in 1888 by the Italian zoologist Tommaso Salvadori based on a specimen collected near "Lago Ciar-Ciar" (now  Haro Ch'erch'er Hayk') in the Ahmar Mountains of central Ethiopia. He coined the binomial name Francolinus castaneicollis. The species is now placed in the genus Pternistis that was introduced by the German naturalist Johann Georg Wagler in 1832. The specific epithet castaneicollis combines the Latin castaneus meaning "chestnut-brown" and the Modern Latin -collis meaning "necked". The chestnut-naped spurfowl is monotypic: no subspecies are recognised.

Notes

References

External links
Xeno-canto: audio recordings of the chestnut-naped spurfowl

chestnut-naped spurfowl
Birds of the Horn of Africa
chestnut-naped spurfowl
Taxonomy articles created by Polbot